Brett Halsey (born Charles Oliver Hand, June 20, 1933) is an American film actor, sometimes credited as Montgomery Ford. He appeared in B pictures and in European-made feature films. He originated the role of John Abbott on the soap opera The Young and the Restless (from May 1980 to March 1981).

Halsey is a great-nephew of the United States Navy Admiral William F. Halsey Jr.,
also known as Bull Halsey, commander of the Pacific Allied naval forces during World War II. Universal Pictures selected Brett Halsey's acting name from the admiral.

Career
Interested in acting since he was a child, young Brett was employed as a page at CBS Television studios, where he met Jack Benny and Benny's wife, Mary Livingstone, who presented him to William Goetz, the head of Universal Pictures, who placed him in a school with other aspiring actors for the studio.

Halsey appeared as Swift Otter, a Cheyenne Indian in the 1956 episodes "The Spirit of Hidden Valley" and "The Gentle Warrior" of the CBS western series, Brave Eagle, starring Keith Larsen as a young Indian chief. In that same year he played “Elser” (a troubled teen cowboy) in James Arness’s TV Western Series  Gunsmoke.

In 1958, Halsey guest-starred several times as Lieutenant Summers in Richard Carlson's syndicated western series, Mackenzie's Raiders, a fictional account of cavalry Colonel Ranald S. Mackenzie, set at Fort Clark, Texas. That same year, Halsey had the lead role of a life-saving sailor in an episode of another syndicated series, Highway Patrol. He also appeared in Harbor Command, a military drama about the United States Coast Guard. He appeared as Robert Finchley in the 1958 Perry Mason episode, "The Case of the Cautious Coquette", and starred in the Roger Corman teen flick The Cry Baby Killer. In 1959, he had a co-starring role in the science-fiction film The Atomic Submarine. Halsey appeared in the episode "Thin Ice" in 1959 of Five Fingers.

From 1961–62, Halsey starred with Barry Coe, Gary Lockwood, and Gigi Perreau in the ABC adventure television series Follow the Sun, a story of two free-lance magazine writers living in Honolulu, Hawaii.

In 1961, Halsey won the Golden Globe Award for "New Star of the Year". His Follow the Sun co-star, Barry Coe, had won the same honor in 1960. The award was discontinued in 1983.

Halsey played supporting and co-starring roles in Hollywood, having appeared in such films as Return of the Fly (1959), Jet Over the Atlantic (1959), The Best of Everything (1959), Return to Peyton Place (1961) and Twice-Told Tales  (1963). By the early 1960s, he relocated to Italy where he found himself in demand in adventurous films such as Seven Swords for the King (1962) or The Avenger of Venice (1964), being often cast a swashbuckling hero. He also appeared in a few Spaghetti Westerns and Eurospy films, including Espionage in Lisbon (1965), Kill Johnny Ringo (1966), Today We Kill, Tomorrow We Die! (1968), All on the Red (1968), Twenty Thousand Dollars for Seven (1969) and Roy Colt and Winchester Jack (1970), sometimes using the name Montgomery Ford.

He returned to the United States in the early 1970s and worked in film and television. He appeared in the serials General Hospital and Love Is a Many Splendored Thing, and films such as Where Does It Hurt? (1972) with Peter Sellers. He had supporting roles in higher-profile films such as Ratboy (1986) and The Godfather Part III (1990), and worked with Italian horror director Lucio Fulci on The Devil's Honey (1986), Touch of Death (1988), A Cat in the Brain (1990) and Demonia (1990). He also appeared as the captain of a luxury space liner in the Buck Rogers in the 25th Century episode "Cruise Ship to the Stars", and the Columbo episode "Death Lends a Hand". Later roles include Beyond Justice (1992), starring Rutger Hauer, Expect No Mercy (1995), and the TV movie Free Fall (1999).

Personal life
In 1954, Halsey married Renate Hoy, an actress who had won the Miss Germany contest that year, and who appeared in such films as The Sea Chase with John Wayne. They had two children, son Charles Oliver Hand, Jr. and daughter Tracy Leigh. Halsey and Hoy divorced in 1959. As an adult, their son Charles, known as "Rock Halsey" and "Rock Bottom", was a member of the Los Angeles-based punk rock band Rock Bottom & The Spys. Charles was murdered in prison while serving a 25-year sentence for drug-related crimes.

From 1960 to 1962, Halsey was married to Italian actress Luciana Paluzzi. They had one son, Christian. In 1961, the two co-starred as a newlywed couple in the film, Return to Peyton Place. In 1964, Halsey married the popular German actress and singer Heidi Brühl. They had two children, son Clayton Alexander Siegfried and daughter Nicole. They were divorced in 1976. Toward the end of the 1990s, Halsey moved to San José, Costa Rica, to teach film acting. He now resides in Laguna Hills with his fourth wife, Victoria (née Korda), granddaughter of Alexander Korda. He writes and makes occasional film appearances.

Selected filmography

To Hell and Back (1955)
Gunsmoke (TV Series) as Elser in S1E21’s “Helping Hand” (1956)
High School Hellcats (1958)
Return of the Fly (1958)
The Cry Baby Killer (1958)
Lafayette Escadrille (1958)
The Girl in Lovers Lane (1960)
Four Fast Guns (1960)
Desire in the Dust (1960) as Dr. Ned Thomas
Return to Peyton Place (1961)
The Seventh Sword (1962)
The Magnificent Adventurer (1963)
The Avenger of Venice (1964)
Berlin, Appointment for the Spies (1965)
Espionage in Lisbon (1965)
Kill Johnny Ringo (1966)
Today We Kill... Tomorrow We Die! (1968)
All on the Red (1968)
Twenty Thousand Dollars for Seven (1969)
Roy Colt & Winchester Jack (1970)
Four Times That Night (1971)
The Dukes of Hazzard (1979) as Dunlap (Episode: The Rustlers)
The Dukes of Hazzard (1982) as Carter (Episode: Enos in Trouble)
The Dukes of Hazzard (1984) as Jason Dillard (Episode: Dukes in Hollywood)
The Devil's Honey (1986)
Touch of Death (1988)
A Cat in the Brain (1990)
The Godfather Part III (1990) as Douglas Michelson
Demonia (1990)
Kung Fu: The Legend Continues (1994) as Commissioner Kincaid

References

External links

1933 births
Living people
American expatriates in Italy
American male film actors
American male soap opera actors
American male television actors
Male Spaghetti Western actors
New Star of the Year (Actor) Golden Globe winners
Male actors from Santa Ana, California